Hwang Byung-Ju (born 5 March 1984) is a South Korean footballer. Since 2009, he has played for Daejeon Hydro & Nuclear Power FC.

Hwang previously played for Daejeon Citizen in the K-League.

References

External links 

1984 births
Living people
South Korean footballers
Daejeon Hana Citizen FC players
K League 1 players
Korea National League players
Association football midfielders